Autorité des marchés financiers may refer to:
Autorité des marchés financiers (France)
Autorité des marchés financiers (Québec)